Émile-Auguste Chartier (3 March 1868 – 2 June 1951), commonly known as Alain, was a French philosopher, journalist, and pacifist. He adopted his pseudonym in homage to the 15th-century Norman poet Alain Chartier.

Early life
Alain was born in 1868 in Mortagne-au-Perche (Orne). He entered Lycée d'Alençon in 1881 and studied there for five years. On 13 June 1956, the lycée was renamed Lycée Alain, after its most famous student.

In 1892, Alain graduated from École Normale Supérieure and received the agrégation in philosophy.

Career
He subsequently taught at various institutions: Pontivy, Lorient, Lycée Pierre Corneille in Rouen, and, in Paris: (Lycée Condorcet and Lycée Michelet). From 1903, he contributed to several journals using his pseudonym, Alain. He was most commonly referred to as "Alain" by his pupils and peers.

In 1909, he was appointed a teacher (or professor) at the Lycée Henri-IV in Paris. He deeply influenced his pupils, who included Raymond Aron, Simone Weil, Georges Canguilhem, and André Maurois. Reviewing the beneficial effect he had on his former pupils Simone Weil and Simone de Beauvoir, Professor John Hellman writes that Alain was the greatest teacher of their generation.

Books
Alain foretold and denounced the First World War but, when hostilities began, he enlisted as a soldier and, refusing promotion, served in the ranks for the whole war.  During those years, while in the trenches, he wrote Mars, ou la guerre jugée (1921) [Mars, or The Truth about War], Quatre-vingt-un chapitres sur l'esprit et les passions (1917) [Eighty-One Chapters about the Spirit and Passions], and Le système des beaux-arts (1920) [System of the Fine Arts].

He later wrote many other books including Propos sur le bonheur (1925) [About Happiness], Le citoyen contre les pouvoirs (1926) [The Citizen against the Powers], Les Idées et les âges (1927) [Ideas and Ages], Entretiens au bord de la mer (1931) [Conversations by the Edge of the Sea], Propos sur l'éducation (1932) [About Education], Idées (1932) [Ideas], Les Dieux (1934) [The Gods], Histoire de mes pensées (1936) [History of my Thoughts], and Les Aventures de coeur (1945) [Adventures of the Heart].

Theorist
He was a leading theorist of radicalism, and his influence extended through the Third and Fourth Republics. He stressed individualism, seeking to defend the citizen against the State. He warned against all forms of power – military, clerical, and economic. To oppose them he exalted the small farmer, the small shopkeeper, the small town, and the little man. He idealized country life and saw Paris as a dangerous font of power. Despite the liberalism of his published work, during World War II he expressed right-wing views in some of his private writings: in July 1940 he expressed hope that the Free French Forces would be defeated, and he also described Adolf Hitler as "a modern mind, an invincible spirit", who dealt with the "Jewish question" with "extraordinary eloquence and remarkable sincerity".

In his diary published under the title Journal inédit by Emmanuel Blondel, Alain writes "I would like, as far as I am concerned, to get rid of antisemitism, but I can't achieve this." (Journal inédit, Editions des equateurs). He calls his own antisemitism, in a self-disparaging manner, a "sad passion" using a Spinozist expression meaning "a passion that expresses weakness, powerlessness". In 1946, in a new Preface to his book Spinoza Alain writes: 
 "Tel est donc le sens du Spinozisme, sens bien positif et bien aisé à saisir, pourvu qu'on soit persuadé que l'on est en présence de l'Esprit universel. Cette persuasion vous rendra la pensée supportable, et soudain vous vous reconnaîtrez homme, toujours à la lumière de l'axiome : Homo homini deus, qui est la clef de la future République et de l'égalité 1848. Je dis égalité, parce qu'il ne se peut pas que l'homme n'ait pas de passions et parce que toute affection cesse d'être une passion dès qu'on en forme une idée adéquate. Là est le secret de la Paix, qui dans tous les cas est la Paix de l'âme, vérité très méconnue. Par ce moyen vous formerez le parti Spinoza, que vous vous garderez d'appeler le parti juif, mais qui n'en sera pas moins ce parti-là. Alors, sans combat, le nazisme, le fascisme et toute sorte de despotisme seront vaincus, et la méchanceté exactement impuissante, comme elle est (car elle n'est rien). Tel est l'avenir prochain, que renferme ce petit livre."

The last lines of this quotation [Par ce moyen vous formerez...] expressing Alain's public thought regarding antisemitic hatred and Nazism, deserve attention: 
"Then [when enlightened men have formed the "Spinoza party", the "Jewish party"] without fight, nazism, fascism and all other kinds of despotism will be defeated and malevolence will be properly powerless, as it is actually (for malevolence by itself is nothing). Such is the future that is coming, the future that is contained in this little book." (Alain, Spinoza, Gallimard, Collection TEL, Preface, 1946).

The same ambiguity can be observed as to Alain's attitude towards Hitler. In his Propos, Alain writes that Hitler is "a great patriot". But he adds "When I say that Hitler is one of these great leaders, understand carefully that I feel sorry for the people that have such leaders, and also sorry for their neighbours". (Propos d'Alain, Propos du 10 Avril 1936, Gallimard, Bibliothèque de la Pléiade, Copyright 1956, page 1305).

Death
Chartier died in 1951. He is buried in the Père Lachaise Cemetery.

See also
 List of peace activists

Select bibliography
Mars, or The Truth about War, London, Toronto, and New York: Jonathan Cape & Harrison Smith, 1930. Translated from the French by Doris Mudie and Elizabeth Hill. Foreword by André Maurois. Foreword by Denis Saurat.
Alain on Happiness, New York: Frederick Ungar, 1973; Evanston, IL: Northwestern University Press, 1973, 1989. Translated by Robert D. and Jane E. Cottrell.  introduction by Robert D. Cottrell.
The Gods, New York: New Directions, 1974. Translated by Richard Pevear.

References

Further reading
 André Maurois, Alain, Paris: Éditions Domat, 1950.
 André Maurois, Destins exemplaires (Paris: Plon, 1952); English translation: Profiles of Great Men (translated by Helen Temple Patterson; Ipswich, Suffolk: Tower Bridge Publications, 1954) - contains chapter on Alain.
 Georges Pascal, La pensée d'Alain, Paris: Bordas, 1946.
 Judith Robinson, Alain, lecteur de Balzac et de Stendhal, Paris: Corti, 1958.

External links

About Alain
Alain, Philosophical and Humanistic Norman
Works by Alain 

1868 births
1951 deaths
19th-century French non-fiction writers
19th-century French philosophers
20th-century French non-fiction writers
20th-century French philosophers
Burials at Père Lachaise Cemetery
Continental philosophers
École Normale Supérieure alumni
French classical liberals
French radicals
French male non-fiction writers
French pacifists
Lycée Henri-IV teachers
Lycée Pierre-Corneille alumni
People from Mortagne-au-Perche
Philosophers of culture
Philosophers of history
Philosophers of war
Political philosophers
Radical Party (France) politicians
Scholars of antisemitism
French social commentators
Social philosophers